Maguito Vilela (24 January 1949 – 13 January 2021) was a Brazilian politician who served as a Senator, and was mayor of Goiânia.

Biography
Vilela was a Brazilian politician and lawyer. He was Governor of Goiás from 1995 to 1998. He was also a member of the Brazilian Senate from 1999 to 2007. For a short time in January 2021, Vilela was Mayor of Goiânia.

He died on 13 January 2021, aged 71 in São Paulo from COVID-19 during the COVID-19 pandemic in São Paulo.

References

1949 births
2021 deaths
Deaths from the COVID-19 pandemic in São Paulo (state)
Mayors of Goiânia